Quamby Estate is a country homestead situated on 150 acres in Tasmania's Meander Valley. The estate is a Tasmanian historically important property and dates back to 1828. Quamby was the home of Sir Richard Dry, a premier of Tasmania and the first native-born premier and knight in any Australian colony. The property is now a commercial luxury lodge.

The estate features a white Anglo-Indian designed main homestead referred to as Tasmania's Government House of the North, a function pavilion and a golf course. It is situated near the historic township of Hagley.

History
Quamby Estate was the home of Sir Richard Dry and during his time as premier, Quamby Homestead became known as the "Government House of the North". Sir Richard Dry was born at Elphin Farm, Launceston, on 7 September 1815. His father, Richard Dry Senior had been transported to Tasmania as a political prisoner for his part in the Irish rebellion of 1804, but was granted his freedom in 1818.

When Dry (Senior) died in 1843 he left the Quamby Estate's  to his son. Quamby Estate's main house is a 33-room building in the American Colonial style, that was built over 10 years from 1828.

In adulthood Richard Jnr. married Clara Meredith. His parliamentary career began in 1845, when he was nominated to the non-elected Legislative Council by the governor, Sir John Eardley-Wilmot. In 1846, following a clash with the governor, Richard Dry and five other Legislative Councillors resigned their seats as a protest against what they considered the unconstitutional conduct of the governor. They were later reinstated by Queen Victoria. 
In 1858, on a two-year visit to England, Queen Victoria bestowed on him a knighthood in honour of his outstanding service to the colony of Tasmania.

Sir Richard Dry had no heirs and just prior to his death in 1868 he had begun to shed the vast acreage of Quamby Estate. Sir Richard was buried beneath the chancery in the Church he founded, St Mary's at Hagley.

Soon after Lady Dry sold Quamby and sailed for England. At the time it was one of the most important land sales ever held in Tasmania.

Recognition
Quamby Estate is listed on both the now-defunct Register of the National Estate and the Tasmanian Heritage Register.

Current usage
Current owners and Virgin Australia founders Brett Godfrey and Rob Sherrard purchased Quamby Estate in 2010. They have also invested in several other tourism assets including the Tasmanian Walking Company, Lake House and Low Head in Tasmania. Brett Godfrey co owns Makepeace Island in Queensland with Sir Richard Branson. In 2011 Quamby Estate was fully restored to a lodge housing 10 guest rooms. Quamby Estate is also the base for Tasmanian Walking Companies' Bay of Fires and Cradle Mountain Huts Guided Walks

In the early 1990s, the lodge added a golf course, whose 8th hole is the longest par 5 in Tasmania at 576 metres. The Georgian Club House was built in the 1850s as original Estate Manager's office.

References

Houses in Tasmania
Homesteads in Australia
Tasmanian places listed on the defunct Register of the National Estate
Meander Valley Council